Kozin (from коза meaning female goat) is a Russian masculine surname. Its Russian feminine counterpart is Kozina, while in other Slavic countries Kozina is also a masculine surname. It may refer to:

Alexey Kozin (1976-1999), Russian military officer killed in War of Dagestan and posthumous Hero of the Russian Federation
Nestor Kozin (1902-1992), Red Army Major general and Hero of the Soviet Union
Vadim Kozin (1903–1994), Russian tenor singer
Valentin Kozin (born 1940), Soviet hockey player
Viktor Kozin  (born 1953), a Russian naval engineer
Yury Kozin (born 1948), Russian weightlifter

See also
Kozina (surname)
Kozhin

Russian-language surnames